Elisha Mitchell (August 19, 1793 – June 27, 1857) was an American educator, geologist and Presbyterian minister. His geological studies led to the identification of North Carolina's Mount Mitchell as the highest peak east of the Mississippi River.

Early life
Elisha Mitchell  was born August 19, 1793, in Washington, Connecticut. He was graduated from Yale University in 1813, where he studied under chemist Benjamin Silliman, whose courses would shape his own teaching career.

Mitchell at the University of North Carolina
Mitchell began his career as a professor at the University of North Carolina at Chapel Hill in 1818, teaching math and natural philosophy. In 1825, he began teaching geology – the field with which he would be primarily associated for the rest of his life. In addition to teaching, Mitchell also served as the university's bursar, accountant, and acting president at various times; he also led chapel services, as he had been ordained by the Presbytery of Orange in Hillsborough, North Carolina in 1821.

Discovery of “Mount Mitchell”
Mitchell completed a geographical survey of North Carolina in 1828 and observed a peak in the Black Mountains he believed to be higher than Grandfather Mountain, at that time thought to be the highest in the region. In 1835, he first measured the height of this mountain, at the time known as Black Dome. Through subsequent measurements in 1838 and 1844, Mitchell proved it was higher than New Hampshire’s Mount Washington, establishing the peak as the highest above sea level in the Eastern U.S..

Findings challenged

Elisha Mitchell fell to his death at nearby Mitchell Falls in 1857, having returned to verify his earlier measurements, which had been challenged by state senator Thomas Clingman, a former student of Mitchell's. Clingman's favorite for the highest peak was "Smoky Dome," a summit that was eventually measured to be just 41 feet shorter than Mitchell's "Black Dome." "Smoky Dome," now Clingmans Dome, was named for Thomas Clingman after the measurements were established.

Mitchell was originally buried in Asheville, but was reinterred in a tomb on the mountain in 1858. In 1881–82 the U.S. Geological Survey upheld Mitchell’s measurements and officially named his peak Mt. Mitchell.

Honors
The  Journal of the Elisha Mitchell Scientific Society, published by the North Carolina Academy of Science, was founded in his honor in 1883.

On August 18, 1888, University of North Carolina Alumni erected an obelisk memorializing him at his grave site atop Mt. Mitchell. On January 1, 1915, high winds destroyed the monument. It was replaced 13 years later by the funeral cairn and plaque currently marking his tomb. "University" is misspelled on the plaque.

Mitchell County, North Carolina, is named after him. Mount Mitchell, however, is not within the boundaries of Mitchell County, but in neighbouring Yancey County.

References

External links

American geologists
1793 births
1857 deaths
Leaders of the University of North Carolina at Chapel Hill
University of North Carolina at Chapel Hill faculty
Mountaineering deaths